Karen S. Evans is a former United States Senate confirmed, Presidential Appointed executive, who served as the first Assistant Secretary for Cybersecurity, Energy Security and Emergency Response at the U.S. Department of Energy. An executive who served in three Presidential Appointed positions in two Administrations.

Ms. Evans currently serves as the Managing Director of the Cyber Readiness Institute.

Education 
Ms. Evans holds a Master of Business Administration, a Master of Arts Public History certificate, and a Bachelor of science  in Chemistry from West Virginia University.

Career 
Ms. Evans previously served as the first Assistant Secretary for Cybersecurity, Energy Security and Emergency Response for the U.S. Department of Energy (DOE). She was sworn in on August 28, 2018, and provided strategic direction, leadership and management to address emerging threats while improving energy infrastructure security and supporting the DOE national security mission.

Prior to being named Assistant Secretary at DOE, Ms. Evans was the national director of the U.S. Cyber Challenge, a public-private partnership focused on building the cyber workforce. She served on the Trump Transition and Landing Teams to develop the management agenda addressing technology initiatives government wide.

Ms. Evans served as the Administrator for the Office of Electronic Government and Information Technology at the Office of Management and Budget (OMB) during the George W. Bush administration. At OMB, she oversaw nearly $71 billion in annual IT funds, including implementation of IT throughout the federal government. Previously, she served as the CIO for DOE and at the director level with both the U.S. Department of Justice and the Farmers Home Administration.

Evans ia a Fellow of the National Academy of Public Administration.

Notes

Year of birth missing (living people)
Living people
Chief information officers
West Virginia University alumni